Fouka or Fukah may refer to:

Fouka District, a district in Tipaza Province, Algeria
Fouka, Algeria, a commune in Tipaza Province, Algeria
Fouka, Egypt, a town in Mersa Matruh, Egypt

See also
Foukas, a mountain in Greece